Phillips Elder Wilson, Jr. (born January 19, 1937) is a jazz trombonist, arranger, and teacher. He has taught at the Berklee College of Music and the New England Conservatory of Music. He attended Phillips Exeter Academy and New England Conservatory.

Career
He began on piano but was advised to switch to trombone due to his having a mild form of dyslexia. This condition did not hamper his music, and by fifteen he had turned professional. He played for Herb Pomeroy's band from 1955 to 1957 and then toured with the Dorsey Brothers. In 1960 he was drafted into the U.S. Army and served on NORAD Band.  Later, he worked with Woody Herman and in the 1960s wrote music for Buddy Rich. He formed an ensemble that became one of the most well-regarded college jazz bands.

Wilson played with Louis Armstrong at the 1964 Grammy Awards.

His arrangement of "Mercy, Mercy, Mercy" for Buddy Rich received a Grammy Award nomination.

The City of Boston proclaimed December 9, 1995 Phil Wilson Day for his contributions to jazz education.

In April 2004, Wilson was awarded an Honorary Doctorate of Music from Berklee College of Music during the 40th anniversary celebration of his Rainbow Band.

In 2014, Wilson created an online video series with Paul The Trombonist that documented Wilson's pedagogy.

Notable students
 Terri Lyne Carrington
 Cyrus Chestnut
 Hal Crook
 Roy Hargrove
 Aubrey Logan
 Delfeayo Marsalis
 Elliot Mason
 Makoto Ozone
 Mika Pohjola
 Paul The Trombonist
 John Scofield
 Ernie Watts

Discography
 1968: Prodigal Sun (Freeform)
 1975: The Sound of the Wasp (ASI)
 1976: That's All (Famous Door) with John Bunch
 1977: Live and Cookin (Outrageous) with Howie Smith
 1980: New York Axis (Famous Door) with John Bunch, Vic Dickenson, Butch Miles
 1980: Fruits  (Circle)
 1983: Live!! at the Berklee Performance Center (Shiah) with Makoto Ozone
 1983: Live at Joe Segal's Jazz Showcase (Shiah)
 1985: Latin America Tour (Shiah)
 1989: The Wizard of Oz Suite (Capri)
 1990: Pal Joey Suite (Capri)
 1995: AC-Cent-Tchu-Ate the Positive: Arlen Songs (Seaside)
 2005: The Music of Antonio Carlos Jobim (Torrey plump

As sideman
With Woody Herman
 Woody Herman–1963 (Philips, 1963)1964

References

American jazz trombonists
Male trombonists
American music arrangers
Berklee College of Music faculty
1937 births
Living people
21st-century trombonists
21st-century American male musicians
American male jazz musicians
Matteson-Phillips Tubajazz Consort members